is a Japanese football player. She currently plays as a midfielder for Japanese WE League club Omiya Ardija Ventus. She played for Japan at the 2010 FIFA U-17 Women's World Cup and the 2012 FIFA U-20 Women's World Cup, winning silver at the former and bronze at the latter.

Career 
Influenced by her father, a football coach, she started playing football at the age of 6.

In elementary school she joined the strongest club in her prefecture, Fortuna SC.

In junior high school, she competed for Japan at the U-15 level.

At the U-17 level, she contributed to Japan's second place at the U-17 Women's World Cup, held in Trinidad at Tobago in 2010.

In the spring of 2012, at the age of 18, she joined INAC Kobe Leonessa.

She was a member of the Japanese team that won the bronze medal at the 2012 FIFA U-20 Women's World Cup.

Popularity and fan following 
For years Ayu Nakada has been a hot topic in Japan, attracting much attention for her looks (cuteness, idol-like/model-like appearance).

In 2014 she placed fifth in the survey "Which Japanese female soccer player would you want to date?".

In 2016 she was selected to be the face of the poster promoting the Internet filtering rules for schools and other children's facilities, newly adopted in Hyogo Prefecture.

Career statistics

Club

Honours

Club 
Tokiwaki Gakuen High School Soccer Club
 National High School Women's Football Championship Tournament: 2009, 2011
 Challenge League East: 2010, 2011
INAC Kobe Leonessa
 Japan Women's Football League: 2012, 2013
 Empress's Cup All-Japan Women's Soccer Championship Tournament: 2012, 2013, 2015, 2016
 Nadeshiko League Cup: 2013
 Japan and South Korea Women's League Championship: 2012

International 
Japan U19
 AFC U-19 Women's Championship: 2011

Other appearances

Television 
  (BS Asahi)

References

External links 
 Ayu Nakada's profile at FIFA.com
 Ayu Nakada at INAC Kobe Leonessa

1993 births
Living people
Japanese women's footballers
Women's association football midfielders
INAC Kobe Leonessa players
Sportspeople from Yamanashi Prefecture